Loch A'an is a remote freshwater loch set deep within the central Cairngorms plateau, in the Cairngorms National Park, located in the eastern Highlands of Scotland. Loch A'an, also called Loch Avon, is the source of the River Avon. Loch A'an is oriented southwest–northeast and is bounded on three sides by precipitous mountains, cliffs and crags, with the North-East opening out to provide an outflow for the river through Glen Avon.

Geography

To the north of the loch, rising almost vertically, lies the Cairn Gorm, the sixth highest mountain in the United Kingdom. Southwest of Cairn Gorm, at the head of the loch, lies the imposing peak of Ben Macdui, the second-highest mountain in the UK, and to east lies Beinn Mheadhoin, the thirteenth-highest mountain in the UK, again rising almost vertically from the Loch A'an basin.

Gallery

References

A'an
A'an
Cairngorms